The 2014 season of the FFAS Senior League Division 1 is the thirty-fourth season of association football competition in American Samoa.

Format 
Six teams compete in the league. The top team becomes the champion and earns a spot in the 2015–16 OFC Champions League Preliminary Stage. The last place team is relegated to Division 2 while the fifth-place club must play a relegation playoff match against the Division 2 runner up.

Table

References

External links 
 Standings at FIFA.com

FFAS Senior League seasons
Amer
football